The Net is an American drama series based on the 1995 film of the same name. The series starred Brooke Langton as Angela Bennett, the character Sandra Bullock played in the film. Produced in Vancouver, British Columbia, Canada, the series originally aired for one season on the USA Network from July 18, 1998 until canceled on March 27, 1999.

Synopsis
In Seattle, Washington, computer expert and software-design consultant Angela Bennett (Brooke Langton) accidentally receives a top secret email with information about an elite terrorist organization called the Praetorians. Angela, whose online avatar is "Angel", soon discovers that the Praetorians' goal is to take control of people's lives through the use of computers. The Praetorians become aware of Angela's knowledge of them and steal her identity, placing her new identity, Elizabeth Marx, on the FBI's Ten Most Wanted List. Angela is framed for the murder of her neighbor, Tillie, and goes on the run.

Sean Trelawney, the head of the Praetorian security, makes it his personal mission to capture or kill Angela. Angela soon discovers that 14 years earlier, in 1984, her father used to be attached to a secret government project in an underground facility at Copper Canyon. After the project was over, Angela's father, seemingly, abandoned his family, but now Angela believes, he went into hiding to keep his family safe. Dr. Phillip Wayland, one of the last surviving members of the research and development team, assists Angela in getting her to the Copper Canyon facility but is killed when the facility is blown up by the Praetorians. Angela, with the help of a mysterious online persona named "Sorcerer" (voiced by Tim Curry), sets out to stop the Praetorians and win back her true identity while staying one step ahead of both the FBI and the Praetorians.

Initially, Angela communicates with Sorceror via a portable prototype computer, but once the device is accidentally destroyed by a riding lawnmower, she is forced to communicate with him via standard computer equipment and internet cafés as she travels the country evading the authorities and attempting to thwart the Praetorians. Eventually, Angela meets 17-year-old computer genius Jacob Resh, who reveals himself to be "Sorceror". To Angela's surprise, the New York City born and raised Jacob is not British at all like his online voice made him seem to be. During the early 1980s, Jacob's father had worked alongside Angela's father in Copper Canyon but was killed by the Praetorians, who made it look like a suicide. Angela deduces that it was Jacob who sent her the email that set the Praetorians upon her and destroyed her world in the first place. Jacob, whose mother abandoned him in 1988, lives in his widowed grandmother's basement and lives off the royalty payments from a video game he designed when he was 13. He convinces Angela to continue working with him to bring down the Praetorians and Jacob promises to continue to help Angela look for her missing father. To Angela's dismay, they ultimately learn that her father died in 1985.

Eventually, Mr. Olivier, the former Praetorian Board of Directors Chairman, turns on the Praetorians due to them having him committed to an institution and provides Angela and her friends with the means to infiltrate and destroy the Praetorians' main base of operations. Trelawney escapes the invasion but Mr. White, the head of the Praetorians, commits suicide by overdosing on a new synthetic drug called Zero. The Praetorians are destroyed. After Angela's case is reviewed by the FBI, she is exonerated. Not only does Angela get her identity back, she is also given the opportunity to work for the newly formed Center for Intrusion Control, based in her hometown of Seattle. Trelawney, Angela's primary nemesis for the better part of the prior year, infiltrates the FBI training grounds in Quantico, Virginia, and attempts to shoot Angela while on the shooting range, but is gunned down by Angela's new boss, Walter Cizelski, instead.

Angela's first assignment after graduating from her eight-week training course is to put an end to an online fight ring that almost always ends in the death of one of its participants. Meanwhile, Jacob has graduated high school and relocates to Seattle to attend the University of Washington. However, he still has time to assist Angela on her next assignment—stopping the maker of a chemical weapon from distributing it on a larger scale. To that end, Jacob poses as a transfer student at an Oregon high school while Angela pretends to be a substitute chemistry teacher. Ultimately, the high school senior responsible for creating the chemical weapon is shot and incapacitated while trying to deliver it to his buyers, all three of whom are killed by the authorities during the transaction. Angela's final assignment before the series is cancelled is to find out the identity of a killer who uses video surveillance footage of his victims to stalk them before he murders them.  Angela finds herself as the latest target but she and Walter are able to turn the tables on the killer and apprehend him.

Cast

Main
Brooke Langton as Angela Bennett (episodes 1-22)
Joseph Bottoms as Sean Trelawney (episodes 1-19; episodes 20-22 credit only)
Tim Curry as the Voice of the Sorcerer (episodes 1–10)
Eric Szmanda as Jacob "Sorcerer" Resh (episodes 10–22)
Bruce Abbott as Agent Walter Cizelski (episodes 19–22)

Recurring
Kelli Taylor as Anna Kelly (Episodes 1, 2, 3, 4, 7, 9, 18)
Mackenzie Gray as Greg Hearney (Episodes 1, 2, 3, 5, 6, 7, 8, 11, 14, 15, 18 (credit only))
Jim Byrnes as Mr. Olivier (Episodes 4, 6, 9, 10, 11, 12, 13, 15, 19)
Dion Luther as Carl/Michael White (Episodes 4 (as Carl), 12, 14, 15, 16, 17, 19)

Guest stars
 Jack Coleman as Dr. Steven Graf (episode 3: "Transplant")
 Clyde Kusatsu as Greg (episode 6: "Kill the Buddha")
 Keegan Connor Tracy as Nadine (episode 8: "Jump Vector")
 Jeffrey Combs as Max Copernicus (episode 16: "Lunatic Fringe")
 Dwayne "The Rock" Johnson as Brody (episode 20: "Last Man Standing")
 Jeremy Renner as Ned (episode 21: "Chem Lab")

Production

The stunt coordinator for the series was David Jacox.

Episodes

Home media
Sony Pictures Home Entertainment released the complete series on DVD in Region 2 on May 15, 2006.  It was also released on DVD in Region 4 on 21 March 2006.

The order of the episodes on the DVD release is in production order instead of broadcast order, which differed slightly; airing episode #18 is #4, and episodes 5 and 6 are in reverse order, on the DVD release.

References

External links
 

1990s American drama television series
1998 American television series debuts
1999 American television series endings
English-language television shows
Identity theft in popular culture
Live action television shows based on films
Television series by Sony Pictures Television
Television shows filmed in Vancouver
USA Network original programming